Vernon River is a settlement in Queens County, Prince Edward Island. Population of 38 people.

Communities in Queens County, Prince Edward Island